Kalateh-ye Zaman or Kalatehzaman may refer to:
 Kalateh-ye Zaman, North Khorasan
 Kalateh-ye Zaman, Razavi Khorasan